KLCH is a radio station located in Lake City, Minnesota. It operates on the frequency of 94.9 MHz. They are owned Q Media Group, LLC. Lake Hits 95 transmits their signal from a 328-foot height above average terrain antenna located southeast of Stockholm, Wisconsin. They broadcast using 5,000 watts of power and have a coverage area of about 45 miles.

Programming
Lake Hits signed on the air in 2001 with an adult contemporary format.  KLCH switched to the current oldies format in July 2007.   They use the Westwood One "Classic Hits" 24/7 fomat.  However, they have a local morning show.  Lake Hits 95 studios are located in Lake City. KLCH carries high school sports, local news, and weather twice per hour from the Weathereye Weather Center in Woodbury, Minnesota.

References

External links

Radio stations in Minnesota
Oldies radio stations in the United States